Virginie Deloffre is a French writer and physician who won the 2012 Prix des libraires for her first novel .

Biography 
Virginie Deloffre is a physician in Paris in a hospital and took seven years to write Lena, a first novel which "takes us into the Great Siberian North to meet the Russian soul during the troubled times of the Perestroika".

Works 
2011: Léna, Albin Michel,

References

External links 
 Virginie Deloffre, "Léna" on YouTube
 Léna de Virginie Deloffre on Chronique de la rentrée littéraire
 Virginie Deloffre, un envol réussi on L'Humanité (15 December 2011)
 Virginie Deloffre on Babelio

21st-century French novelists
Prix des libraires winners
French medical writers
French women novelists
21st-century French physicians
Living people
21st-century French women writers
Women medical writers
Year of birth missing (living people)